Percy Frank Weston (27 October 1894 – 4 February 1963) was an English professional golfer. He tied for 9th place in the 1924 Open Championship. In 1928 he won the Midland Professional Championship. Five players had tied on 149 after the 36 holes but Weston won the 18-hole playoff scoring 74, two ahead of second place Dick Wheildon.

Tournament wins
1928 Midland Professional Championship

Results in major championships

Note: Weston only played in The Open Championship.

CUT = missed the half-way cut
"T" indicates a tie for a place

References

English male golfers
People from Oadby
Sportspeople from Leicestershire
1894 births
1963 deaths